Serhiy Dolhanskyi (born 15 September 1974 in Zdolbuniv, Ukrainian SSR) is a professional Ukrainian football goalkeeper.

Career
He played for Vorskla Poltava in the Ukrainian Premier League. He joined Vorskla from Metalurh Donetsk in February 2005.

External links 

 Profile on Football Squads

1974 births
Living people
People from Zdolbuniv
Ukrainian footballers
NK Veres Rivne players
FC Metalist Kharkiv players
FC Chornomorets Odesa players
FC Shakhtar Donetsk players
FC Shakhtar-2 Donetsk players
FC Metalurh Donetsk players
FC Vorskla Poltava players
FC Vorskla-2 Poltava players
FC Kryvbas Kryvyi Rih players
FC Kryvbas-2 Kryvyi Rih players
FC CSKA Kyiv players
FC CSKA-2 Kyiv players
FC Systema-Boreks Borodianka players
FC Zhemchuzhyna Odesa players
Ukrainian Premier League players
Ukrainian First League players
Ukrainian Second League players
Association football goalkeepers
Ukraine under-21 international footballers
Sportspeople from Rivne Oblast